Miss Stella is a 1991 Indian Malayalam film, directed by I. Sasi and produced by S. Kumar. The film has musical score by Raveendran.

Cast

Soundtrack
The music was composed by Raveendran and the lyrics were written by Poovachal Khader.

References

External links
 

1991 films
1990s Malayalam-language films